Haughey's Fort is a hill fort in County Armagh, Northern Ireland,  west of the city of Armagh. It is named after the farmer who owned the land it is situated on in the later 19th century. The large hilltop enclosure that is Haughey's Fort is a Scheduled Historic Monument in the townland of Tray, in Armagh City and District Council area, at grid ref: H8351 4529.

Inside the enclosure another ditch encloses an area  in diameter. Archaeological excavation shows that it was occupied in the late Bronze Age, ca. 1100 to 900  BC, after which it was abandoned, although some artefacts discovered were of Iron Age date, suggesting that it was later reoccupied. It was contemporary with the nearby artificial pool known as the King's Stables but was abandoned before Navan Fort,  to the east, was occupied.

References

Chris Lynn, Navan Fort: Archaeology and Myth, Wordwell Books, 2003
J. P. Mallory, "The Other Twin: Haughey's Fort", Ulidia, December Publications, 1994

Archaeological sites in County Armagh
Scheduled monuments in Northern Ireland
Former populated places in Northern Ireland
Military history of County Armagh